Michael Brian Brennan (born 1963) is a United States circuit judge of the United States Court of Appeals for the Seventh Circuit. He was first nominated on August 3, 2017, by President Donald Trump, and was re-nominated in 2018.  He was confirmed May 10, 2018.  He was previously a partner in the Milwaukee law firm Gass Weber Mullins LLC, and served 8 years as a Wisconsin Circuit Court judge.

Education and clerkships 

Brennan received his Bachelor of Arts degree in government and philosophy, cum laude, from the University of Notre Dame in 1986, and his Juris Doctor from Northwestern University School of Law in 1988, where he served as the coordinating note and comment editor of the Northwestern University Law Review and won the Julius H. Miner Moot Court Competition.

Brennan served as a law clerk to Chief Judge Robert W. Warren of the United States District Court for the Eastern District of Wisconsin from 1989 to 1991 and also for Judge Daniel Anthony Manion of the United States Court of Appeals for the Seventh Circuit from 1995 to 1997.

Legal career 

From 1991 to 1995, Brennan was a litigation associate in the Milwaukee office of Foley & Lardner LLP. He later became an assistant district attorney in Milwaukee County, where he first-chaired numerous trials.

In 1999, Brennan was appointed by Wisconsin Governor Tommy Thompson to serve as a judge of the Milwaukee County Circuit Court. Taking office in January 2000, he served in this position until November 30, 2008, presiding over almost 300 trials and thousands of motions in criminal and civil cases. During that time, he served as the presiding judge of the civil division of that court.

Brennan returned to private practice in 2009 and became a partner at the law firm of Gass Weber Mullins, where he was a trial lawyer in the area of commercial litigation and handled appeals in federal and state courts. He was a partner before being confirmed to the Seventh Circuit. Brennan is a mediator and an AAA certified arbitrator and has published more than 50 articles on federal practice and procedure and criminal sentencing.

Federal judicial service 

On August 3, 2017, President Donald Trump nominated Brennan to serve as a United States Circuit Judge of the United States Court of Appeals for the Seventh Circuit, to the seat vacated by Judge Terence T. Evans, who assumed senior status on January 17, 2010. On January 3, 2018, his nomination was returned to the President under Rule XXXI, Paragraph 6 of the United States Senate.

Upon the announcement of his nomination, Senator Tammy Baldwin criticized President Trump for bypassing the bipartisan commission composed to vet potential judicial candidates. She withheld her blue slip. However, her Republican counterpart in the Senate, Senator Ron Johnson, supported his nomination. On January 5, 2018, President Donald Trump announced his intent to renominate Brennan to the Seventh Circuit. On January 8, 2018, his renomination was sent to the Senate. On January 24, 2018, a hearing on his nomination was held before the Senate Judiciary Committee. On February 15, 2018, the Senate Judiciary Committee reported his nomination out of the committee by an 11–10 vote. Democrats strongly objected to the vote, noting that Senator Tammy Baldwin was still withholding her blue slip. On May 9, 2018, the Senate agreed to invoke cloture on his nomination by a 49–47 vote. Brennan's nomination was confirmed on May 10, 2018, by a 49–46 vote. He received his judicial commission on May 11, 2018.

Affiliations and awards 

Brennan is the founder of the Milwaukee chapter of the Federalist Society. He has served as a member of the Wisconsin Legislative Council's Special Committee on Crimes against Children. Brennan also chaired the Wisconsin Governor's Judicial Selection Advisory Committee. He received a special commendation from the United States Department of Justice for his service as a member of the National Advisory Committee on Violence Against Women.

Electoral history 

| colspan="6" style="text-align:center;background-color: #e9e9e9;"| General Election, April 3, 2001

| colspan="6" style="text-align:center;background-color: #e9e9e9;"| General Election, April 3, 2007

See also 
 Donald Trump judicial appointment controversies

References

External links 
 
 
 Biography at the Federalist Society

|-

1963 births
Living people
20th-century American lawyers
21st-century American lawyers
21st-century American judges
Federalist Society members
Judges of the United States Court of Appeals for the Seventh Circuit
Lawyers from Milwaukee
Northwestern University Pritzker School of Law alumni
State attorneys
United States court of appeals judges appointed by Donald Trump
University of Notre Dame alumni
Wisconsin state court judges